Jana Fischer (born 8 May 1999) is a German snowboarder. She competed in the 2018 Winter Olympics. and in the 2022 Winter Olympics, in Women's snowboard cross.

References

External links 
 
 
 
 

 

1999 births
Living people
German female snowboarders
Olympic snowboarders of Germany
Snowboarders at the 2018 Winter Olympics
Snowboarders at the 2022 Winter Olympics
Snowboarders at the 2016 Winter Youth Olympics
Youth Olympic gold medalists for Germany
21st-century German women